Méridja (little swamp) is a town and commune in Kénadsa District, Béchar Province, in western Algeria. As of 2008 the population of the commune was 592, up from 532 in 1998, with an annual growth rate of 1.1%. This makes it the smallest commune by population in Béchar Province.

Geography

Some low, rocky hills rise both to the north and south of the town, but there are no significant mountains in the immediate vicinity of the town.

Climate

Méridja has a hot desert climate (Köppen climate classification BWh), with extremely hot summers and cool winters, and very little precipitation throughout the year.

Economy

Agriculture is an important industry in Méridja. There are a total of 10,020 date palms planted in the commune. Animal husbandry is particularly significant; as of 2009 there were 1,758 sheep, 2,182 goats, 2,033 camels, and 180 cattle. There were also 52,800 chickens in 6 buildings.

Infrastructure and housing

100% of Méridja's population is connected to drinking water, 100% is connected to the sewerage system, but only 81% (including 135 buildings) have access to electricity, the equal lowest rate of electrification in the province with El Ouata. There are no fuel service stations in the town; the nearest is in Kénadsa.

Méridja has a total of 148 houses, of which 103 are occupied, giving an occupation rate of 5.7 inhabitants per occupied building.

Transportation

Education

There is 1 elementary school, with 6 classrooms, all of which are in use. There are a total of 103 school students. Secondary students must travel to Kénadsa to study.

2.6% of the population has a tertiary education (the second lowest in the province), and another 11.9% has competed secondary education. The overall literacy rate is 76.6%, and is 83.3% among males and 68.0% among females.

Health

Méridja has 2 polyclinics and a room care facility. The nearest hospital is in Béchar.

Religion

Méridja has one operational mosque.

Sports
The town is home to association football club JS Saoura which currently plays in the Algerian Ligue Professionnelle 1.

Localities
The commune is composed of two localities:
Meridja
Tibarbatine

References

Neighbouring towns and cities

Communes of Béchar Province
Algeria
Cities in Algeria